The M426 8-inch shell was a  chemical artillery shell designed for use by the U.S. Army.

References

Chemical weapon delivery systems
Artillery shells
Chemical weapons of the United States